The 1924 United States Senate election in Iowa took place on November 4, 1924. Incumbent Republican Senator Smith W. Brookhart ran for re-election to a full term in office against Democrat Daniel F. Steck.

In the initial vote, Brookhart was certified as the victor over Steck. However, Steck became the first person to successfully challenge a popular election to the Senate in 1926, when the Senate voted to remove Brookhart from office and seat Steck in his place.

, this remains the only instance in which a Senator was removed and replaced by his colleagues after he had already been seated for the term.

Republican primary

Candidates
Smith W. Brookhart, incumbent Senator since 1922
Burton E. Sweet, former U.S. Representative from Waverly and candidate for Senate in 1922

Results

Democratic primary

Candidates
John D. Denison, candidate for U.S. Representative in 1910
Charles Rollin Keyes, geologist, ornithologist, and candidate for U.S. Senate in 1918
Daniel F. Steck, commander of the Iowa American Legion

Results

General election

Campaign
Brookhart, though nominally a Republican, had alienated most of the national and state party establishment by 1924. As early as 1920, he had rankled senior Republicans with his courting of blue-collar union voters and his primary challenge to senior Senator Albert B. Cummins. In 1924, he demanded the withdrawal of vice presidential nominee Charles Dawes and declined to support President Calvin Coolidge for re-election, though he did not outright endorse Progressive Robert M. La Follette.

During the campaign, the Republican State Central Committee withdrew support from Brookhart and one Republican organization went so far as to distribute sample ballots showing a 'x' in the Republican column with another 'x' next to Steck's name.

By October, all but one of the state's Republican daily newspapers had endorsed Steck.

Results
On the day of the election, some newspapers reported that Steck had won. However, two days later, rural districts gave Brookhart a small lead. His victory was certified and he was seated for a full term as Senator.

Aftermath and reversal 
After the election, the Senate Republicans retaliated by stripping Brookhart, LaFollette, and two other progressive Republicans of their committee appointments and excluding them from the party conference.

Challenges
In January, Steck served notice of his intention to challenge Brookhart's inauguration for the new term on the grounds of election fraud. The Iowa Republican Party also challenged Brookhart's election on the grounds that he was not a Republican.

Brookhart was sworn into office on March 4, 1925, without incident. On March 10, the Senate referred both challenges to the Committee on Privileges and Elections.

Steck's challenge alleged that thousands of ballots were unlawfully counted for Brookhart while many of his own were discarded or altered.

The Iowa Republican challenge alleged that Brookhart had fraudulently represented himself as a party member until the filing deadline, and then toured the state supporting the principles and candidates of the Progressive Party. The state committee argued that Republicans had in good faith voted for a person they assumed to be a regular party member, and that Brookhart had therefore committed election fraud.

Investigation and recount
A subcommittee of two Republicans and two Democrats commenced the investigation of the case on July 20, 1925. By agreement of Brookhart and Steck, all of the more than 900,000 ballots were transported from Iowa to Washington for a recount.

A number of disputed ballots had evidently attempted to replicate local newspaper endorsements for Steck by drawing an arrow pointing to the box marked for Steck; these ballots had been excluded from the original count under an Iowa law banning extraneous markings but were counted by the subcommittee on the grounds that it was clear the voter had meant. Some ballots arrived in Washington with broken seals and there were discrepancies between the voter rolls and the number of ballots received.

On March 29, 1926, the committee issued its report finding that Steck had received a plurality of 1,420 votes and should be seated. In a minority report, Senator Hubert D. Stephens protested that some ballots had not been properly examined and secured, that 3,500 fewer ballots were received than cast, and that the majority did not count 1,300 properly marked straight Republican ballots for Brookhart.

Senate debate and vote
In the debate before the whole Senate, speeches focused on the conflict between Iowa state election law and the federal recount. Brookhart's supporters maintained that there was no precedent for overruling state election laws in reviewing contested elections.

On April 12, the Senate voted 45 to 41 to unseat Brookhart and seat Steck.

Aftermath
Steck became the first Democrat to represent Iowa in the Senate since 1859. He served out the remainder of that term which ultimately became his. He was soundly defeated for re-election in 1930, the only incumbent Democrat in the country to lose in that cycle. Though they gained eight seats nationwide, Steck's loss cost Democrats control of the Senate.

Brookhart ran for Senate again in 1926 and unseated Senator Cummins, who died shortly after the primary. He served until 1933, when he was defeated by Henry Field in the Republican primary. Brookhart ran in the 1932 general election as a Progressive, but finished a distant third behind Field and the Democratic victor, Richard L. Murphy.

See also 
 1924 United States Senate elections

References

Further reading

1924
Iowa
United States Senate